Empire State College (SUNY Empire or ESC) is a public university headquartered in Saratoga Springs, New York.  It is part of the State University of New York (SUNY) system.  Empire State College is a multi-site institution offering associate, bachelor's, master's, doctoral degrees, and distance degrees worldwide through the Center for Distance Learning. The college has approximately 10,000 undergraduate students and has an acceptance rate of 51%.
The college is accredited by the Middle States Commission on Higher Education. 

The School for Graduate Studies offers master's degrees.  Empire State College's Center for International Programs also has special programs for students in Lebanon through the American University of Science and Technology, Czech Republic, and Greece. From 2005 to 2010, Empire State College and Anadolu University in Turkey offered a joint MBA program. It also has arranged learning opportunities with UAW-Ford University, United Steelworkers of America, Corporate Noncredit Training, eArmyU, Navy College Program and the International Brotherhood of Electrical Workers (Local Union #3). 
Empire State College administrative offices are located in Saratoga Springs, New York.

History

Empire State College was designed by then SUNY Chancellor Ernest Boyer in a document titled "Prospectus for a New University College."  In 1971, Ernest L. Boyer, chancellor of the State University of New York, conceived a new college for the state's public university: a college dedicated to adult, student-centered education. Empire State College would invite people into higher education by removing impediments to access such as time, location, institutional processes, and even curricular custom, as well as habits of learning and teaching. Students individually would define their academic needs, purposes and efforts. The college would be flexible in supporting them, through its faculty, policies and procedures, to achieve demonstrable college-level learning. This is the animating idea and the root of Empire State College.

Mascot

Empire State College in 2020 named its first-ever mascot, Blue the Bluebird. A campus-wide vote took place and Blue the Bluebird beat out other finalists, Cam the Chameleon and Van the Vanguard. Students, faculty, staff, and alumni cast 9,922 total votes in the finals. The bluebird is New York's state bird.

Academics
Empire State College fulfills its mission by providing learning opportunities designed to accommodate students with family, work, and community responsibilities. At the core of the learning-teaching environment, individualized study and the creation of an individual degree plan is supported by a faculty mentor to whom each student is assigned. Empire State College students can take advantage of multiple modes of study including guided independent studies, study groups, intensive residencies, online courses, and blended-learning experiences. The college also was one of the first institutions in the United States to develop a program of prior learning assessment, whereby students may earn college credit through assessment of prior learning from their work and life experiences.

The college offers flexible programs, including distance education, extensive transfers of credits from other universities, prior-learning assessment for knowledge gained through independent studies, standardized evaluations, and the opportunity to design one's own degree with an academic advisor or mentor.

Locations

Notable alumni

Amy Arbus (2003), photographer
Ita Aber, artist and curator
Kenny Barron (1978), jazz pianist
Ginny Brown-Waite (1976), former US Congresswoman
Dawoud Bey (1990), photographer
Frank Enea (1993), musician and composer
Alice Fulton (1978), English professor, winner of the 1991 John D. and Catherine T. MacArthur Foundation fellowship for poetry
Deborah Gregory (1986), author of Cheetah Girls
Karl Grossman (1976), professor of journalism SUNY Old Westbury, author, TV program host
Bob Herbert (1988), New York Times columnist
Rich Hickey (1992), creator of Clojure programming language
Erick Johnson, American contemporary artist
Bernard Kerik (2002), former Commissioner of the New York Police Department
James J. LeCleir (1974), U.S. Air Force Major General
Steven McLaughlin, member of the New York State Assembly, County Executive of Rensselaer County, New York
Kathy Muehlemann (1978), abstract painter & professor  
Elliott Murphy (1988), singer-songwriter & author
Mae Ngai (1992) historian, Columbia University
Alan Rachins (1974), television actor
Mark J.F. Schroeder (1982), New York Commissioner of Motor Vehicles
 Norman Seabrook, former president Of New York City Correction Officers' Benevolent Association (1995-2016), convicted on corruption charges
James M. Sheppard (1999), chief of the Rochester Police Department and member of the Monroe County Legislature
Melba Tolliver (1998), journalist, reporter, and news anchor
Herb Trimpe (1997), artist on "The Incredible Hulk" comic series
Bob Watson (1999), major league baseball player and executive
Reggie Witherspoon (1995), college basketball coach

See also
University of New York, Tirana
University of New York, Prague
SUNY Learning Network
Non-traditional student

References

External links

State University of New York university colleges
Public universities and colleges in New York (state)
Distance education institutions based in the United States
Buildings and structures in Saratoga Springs, New York
Universities and colleges on Long Island
Tourist attractions in Rockland County, New York
Universities and colleges in Rockland County, New York
Universities and colleges in Syracuse, New York